The Killer Bunnies, formerly Outta Control, was a Canadian house/Eurodance project based out of Toronto, Ontario.

History
DJ/remixer/producers Barry Harris and Rachid Wehbi, vocalist Simone Denny and Kimberley Wetmore originally came together and began recording under the name Outta Control.

From 1995 to 1997, the group had three hit singles on Billboard's Hot Dance Music/Club Play chart: "Tonight It's Party Time", "One of Us" (Joan Osborne cover), and finally "Sinful Wishes" (Kon Kan cover) in 1997.

After changing the name of the group to Killer Bunnies, the same musicians recorded a fourth charting single, "I Can't Take the Heartbreak".

Discography

As Outta Control

As Killer Bunnies

References 

Musical groups established in 1995
Canadian house music groups
Canadian electronic music groups
Canadian Eurodance groups
Musical groups disestablished in 1998
Universal Records artists